Alison Mary Goate is a professor of neuroscience and Director of the Loeb Center for Alzheimer's Disease at Icahn School of Medicine at Mount Sinai, New York City. She was previously professor of genetics in psychiatry, professor of genetics, and professor of neurology at Washington University School of Medicine.

The Goate Lab studies the genetics and molecular bases of Alzheimer's disease, frontotemporal dementia, and alcoholism.

Education and early career 
After receiving her undergraduate degree in biochemistry at the University of Bristol (UK) and her graduate training at Oxford University (UK), Goate studied under Professors Theodore Puck, Professor Louis Lim and Dr. John Hardy. She received a Royal Society University Research Fellowship to conduct research at St. Mary's Hospital Medical School in London.

Awards and affiliations 
She has received the Potamkin Prize from the American Academy of Neurology (1993), the Zenith Award from the Alzheimer's Association, Senior Investigator Award from the Metropolitan Life Foundation, the St. Louis Academy of Science Innovation Award, Carl and Gerty Cori Faculty Achievement Award at Washington University in St. Louis. (1994), and a Lifetime Achievement Award from the Alzheimer's Association (2015). She is a fellow of the American Association for the Advancement of Science. She also serves on the faculty of the Hope Center for Neurological Disorders and as an elected member of the National Academy of Medicine.

Research 
Goate's research centers on the genetics of Alzheimer's disease and related dementias that led to the development of animal and cellular models and the development of anti-amyloid and anti-tau therapies. She has been the principal investigator on four grants and has co-invented and awarded six patents.

Patents 
APP770 mutant in alzheimer's disease, (1999).
Mutant S182 genes, (1999).
Method for elucidation and detection of polymorphisms, splice variants, and proximal coding mutations using intronic sequences of the Alzheimer's S182 gene, (2000).
Transgenic mouse expressing an APP-FAD DNA sequence, (2001).
 Pathogenic Tau mutations, (2002).
Markers for addiction, (2011).

Grants 

Partial list:

Publications 
Semantic Scholar lists 483 publications, 22,943 citations and 1,808 influential citations of Goate's peer-reviewed and original contribution as of 2019.

Partial list: 
  Cited by 5017 as of October 18, 2019.
  Cited by 2274 as of October 18, 2019. 
  Cited by 793 as of October 18, 2019 
  Cited by 604 as of October 18, 2019. 
  Cited by 419 as of October 18, 2019 
  Cited by 275 as of October 18, 2019.

==References==

Living people
20th-century British biologists
20th-century British women scientists
21st-century British biologists
21st-century British women scientists
Academics of the University of Oxford
Alumni of the University of Bristol
Alumni of the University of Oxford
Alzheimer's disease researchers
British geneticists
British neuroscientists
British women neuroscientists
Fellows of the American Association for the Advancement of Science
Icahn School of Medicine at Mount Sinai faculty
Members of the National Academy of Medicine
Psychiatric geneticists
Washington University School of Medicine faculty
Year of birth missing (living people)